Vincent Anthony Casey (5 May 1918 – 16 September 1981) was an Australian rules footballer who played with North Melbourne in the Victorian Football League (VFL).

Notes

External links 

1918 births
1981 deaths
Australian rules footballers from Victoria (Australia)
North Melbourne Football Club players